The Watson House, also known as the Coombs House, is a historic home located just east of Charlestown, Indiana's town square. It was built about 1900, and is a two-story, rectangular frame dwelling with Queen Anne and Colonial Revival style design elements. It features a full-width front porch supported by slender columns.  Originally located on the site was the James Bigger-built Green Tree Tavern (1812), where Jonathan Jennings, the first governor of Indiana, was given an Inaugural Ball in 1816.

It was added to the National Register of Historic Places in 1983.

References

Jeffersonville, Indiana
Historic American Buildings Survey in Indiana
Houses on the National Register of Historic Places in Indiana
Colonial Revival architecture in Indiana
Queen Anne architecture in Indiana
Houses in Clark County, Indiana
National Register of Historic Places in Clark County, Indiana